The Tennessee Volunteers women's soccer team represents the University of Tennessee (UT) in Knoxville, Tennessee in NCAA Division I women's soccer competition as a member of the Southeastern Conference (SEC).

Along with all other UT women's sports teams, it used the nickname "Lady Volunteers" (or the short form "Lady Vols") until the 2015–16 school year, when the school dropped the "Lady" prefix from the nicknames of all women's teams except in basketball. In 2017 the university announced the return of the “Lady Volunteer” name.

Overview

The University of Tennessee began sponsoring women's soccer in 1996 with Charlie MacCabe as head coach.  Coach MacCabe was replaced by former North Carolina Tar Heel All-American Angela Kelly in 2000.  Coach Kelly had taken the Lady Vols to four SEC Tournament championships and to the NCAA Tournament eight times. Following the 2011 season coach Kelly would leave the program to take over the head coaching job at Texas. Shortly after her departure Brian Pensky was named the third head coach for the Lady Vols soccer team. After winning the SEC conference tournament title in 2021, Pensky left in April 2022 to take the head coach position at Florida State University.  Lady Vols Associate Head Coach Joe Kirt was hired to be the fourth head coach on Rocky Top in May 2022. In Kirt's first season as head coach, he led the Lady Vols to their 3rd consecutive SEC East Championship, earning the team a #6 seed in the NCAA Tournament. Tennessee was upset at home in the first round by Xavier 4–1 to end the year 11–6–2.

Regal Stadium

Dedicated in 2007, Regal Soccer Stadium was built around the old Tennessee Soccer Complex.  The new stadium seats 3,000 people and is named after Regal Entertainment Group, the main financial backer for its construction.

Yearly record

Individual honors

All Americans

Ali Christoph – 2005, 2006
Keely Dowling – 2002, 2003, 2004
Jaimel Johnson – 2007
Kylee Rossi – 2007
 Hannah Wilkinson – 2012
 Jaida Thomas – 2021
 Wrenne French – 2021

References

External links
 

 
NCAA Division I women's soccer teams
1996 establishments in Tennessee
Soccer clubs in Tennessee